Justin Steward Furstenfeld (born December 14, 1975) is an American musician and actor. He is the lead vocalist, guitarist, and lyricist of rock band Blue October. He is also a member of the band Harvard of the South.

Personal life
When not touring with his band, Furstenfeld resides in San Marcos, Texas. He is the brother of Blue October drummer Jeremy Furstenfeld. He has a daughter named Blue Reed Furstenfeld, to whom he dedicated the album Any Man in America. Blue, and Furstenfeld's relationship with her mother, are the subject matter of much of the album.

On June 13, 2012, Furstenfeld proposed to his pregnant girlfriend Sarah. On July 28, 2012, they were married in a private ceremony in Wimberley, Texas. Justin filed for divorce in early 2022, but remains on good terms with Sarah. Together they have a daughter named Sayde Belle, born August 23, 2012. On April 2, 2016, Furstenfeld and his wife had a son, Gunner Black.

In 2020 a documentary was released called "Get Back Up" that covers Furstenfeld's story about depression, addiction, and recovery.

Music career
Growing up, Furstenfeld listened to hip-hop, rock, country, and dance; his favorite artists included Idaho, Marvin Gaye, The Smiths, Peter Gabriel, Red House Painters, The Cure, Cocteau Twins, Bauhaus, and Pink Floyd. He also counts among his influences Michael Stipe, The Pixies, Elliott Smith, Blue Miller, George Winston, Jean-Michel Basquiat, and U2. His first musical memory was Roy Orbison's ballad "Crying".

During his high school years at Houston's High School for the Performing and Visual Arts (HSPVA), he formed the band The Last Wish, which he played in from the age of 13 until 1995. When performing solo, Furstenfeld uses the moniker 5591.

In August 2008, Furstenfeld toured with Stephenie Meyer, author of the Twilight series, in a sold-out four-city book/concert tour.

On October 22, 2009, the Pick Up the Phone Tour was cancelled after Furstenfeld was admitted to a hospital for an extreme anxiety attack, though the band still played two November dates in Austin.

Other interests
In April 2009, Furstenfeld published the book Crazy Making – The Words and Lyrics of Justin Furstenfeld, in which he goes into explicit detail about the inspiration behind every Blue October song to date.

Furstenfeld attended HSPVA on a drama scholarship, acted in several plays in high school, and appeared in the 1996 film Late Bloomers. He made his true feature film debut in the 2022 Christian Sesma directed action film Section Eight playing the character Ajax Abernathy. Furstenfeld's original song "This is What I Live For" also played during film's opening credits. In 2022 Justin acted in the film Lights Out, also directed by Sesma.

Discography
Solo albums
 Songs from an Open Book (2014)
 Open Book Winter Album (2017)

With The Last Wish
 Rooftop Sessions (1993)
 The First of February (1995)

With Blue October
 The Answers (1998)
 Consent to Treatment (2000)
 History for Sale (2003)
 Foiled (2006)
 Approaching Normal (2009)
 Any Man in America (2011)
 Sway (2013)
 Home (2016)
 I Hope You're Happy (2018)
 This Is What I Live For (2020)
 Spinning the Truth Around (Part I) (2022)

With Harvard of the South
 Miracle (2014 – EP)
 Harvard of the South (2020)

As a featured artist
 Canvas – Four Days Awake – "All About You"
 Tarja Turunen – Colours in the Dark – "Medusa"
 Zeale – FRNZ & FNGZ – "Invisible Prisons"

References

1975 births
Alternative rock guitarists
Alternative rock singers
American alternative rock musicians
American male singers
Record producers from Texas
American rock guitarists
American male guitarists
American rock singers
Blue October members
Living people
Musicians from Houston
Songwriters from Texas
People from San Marcos, Texas
Guitarists from Texas
High School for the Performing and Visual Arts alumni
21st-century American singers